Cytospora sacchari is a plant pathogen.

References

External links
 Index Fungorum
 USDA ARS Fungal Database

Fungal plant pathogens and diseases
Diaporthales